This is a list of flag bearers who have represented Guinea at the Olympics.

Flag bearers carry the national flag of their country at the opening ceremony of the Olympic Games.

See also
Guinea at the Olympics

References

Guinea at the Olympics
Guinea
Olympic flagbearers
Olympic flag bearers